Maria Brendle (born October 3, 1983) is a German-Swiss film director and screenwriter based in Zurich. In 2020, she wrote and directed the film Ala Kachuu – Take and Run for which she received a nomination for the Best Live Action Short Film at the 94th Academy Awards.

Career 
Maria Brendle began her career with journalistic activities for various TV stations and worked for several advertising agencies. 
 
From 2008 to 2013 she studied BA Film at the Zurich University of the Arts. Her graduation film “Blinder Passagier” (“The Stowaway”) won numerous awards, including Best Script Writer at the Shanghai International Film Festival and Best Live Action Short at the Chicago International Children's Film Festival, which was qualifying for the 2015 Academy Awards in the category "Best Live Action Short Film". 
 
Maria Brendle is a graduate of the 27th Drehbuchwerkstatt München (2015/2016), where she wrote her first feature film script. She received her Master in cognitive neuroscience (aon) from the Academy of Neuroscience Cologne in 2020. 
 
In August 2020, her short film Ala Kachuu – Take and Run had its world premiere at the 38th Rhode Island International Film Festival and was awarded the "Marlyn Mason Award - First Prize for new voices and new perspectives by women in film". The award winning 38-minute short film tells the story of a Kyrgyz girl who becomes a victim of bride kidnapping and is Maria Brendle's second film to be in consideration for the Academy Awards.

Filmography

Awards

References

External links 
 http://www.maria-brendle.de
 http://www.blinderpassagier.ch
 http://www.filmgerberei.ch/film/alakachuu

German film directors
German women film directors
German screenwriters
German women screenwriters
Swiss film directors
Swiss women film directors
Swiss screenwriters
1983 births
Living people